The RiverCity Rage were a professional indoor football team.  They played home games at the Family Arena in Saint Charles, Missouri, part of the metropolitan area of St. Louis, Missouri, in past seasons, played in the Scottrade Center in downtown St. Louis in the 2006 season, and returned to the Family Arena for the 2007 UIF season.

History
The RiverCity Rage began play in 2001 as the St. Louis Renegades of the Indoor Professional Football League, finishing fourth in the league with a 2-11 record. After the IPFL folded, the team moved to the National Indoor Football League in 2002 and became the RiverCity Renegades. The team finished its first season in the NIFL with a 1-13 record. For 2003–2004, the team was renamed the Show-Me Believers. In the first season under the new name, the team finished with a 4-10 record that showed improvement, despite being a losing record. In 2004, the team's skill increased vastly, and completed the season with a winning record for the first time at 9-5. In 2005, the team was renamed and is currently the RiverCity Rage. The Rage won the 2005 East Atlantic Conference Division with a record of 10-4. With this record, the team was locked in a three-way tie for the best regular-season record; however, the team lost its Conference Quarter Finals game 67 to 64 to the Cincinnati Marshals.

The next season, the team finished in a four-way tie for the regular season record at 13-1, and advanced to the Atlantic Conference championship game, losing to the Fayetteville Guard.

After the 2006 season, the Rage announced they were joining United Indoor Football for 2007. The Rage continued their membership in the United Indoor Football for 2008.

In 2008, the RiverCity Rage struggled through a seven-game losing streak before winning three of their last four games to make the playoffs. They won (37-33) by a last minute touchdown in a home playoff game against the Sioux City Bandits, but lost the Conference Finals on the road to the Bloomington Extreme, 33-7.

In 2009, the Rage played in the Indoor Football League, a new league created out of the merger between the UIF and the Intense Football League. On August 15, 2009, the Rage lost the United Bowl to the Billings Outlaws by the score of 71-62.

Jeff Sprowls, who also owns IFL team the Omaha Beef, announced about a month after the Rage's loss in the IFL Championship game that the RiverCity Rage would be ceasing operations and will not play in the 2010 season, due to financial issues in Omaha . According to the Indoor Football League website the RiverCity Rage could return in 2011, if new owners are found.  In the team's final season, leading the way at quarterback was former two-time ArenaBowl champion John Dutton.

Season-by-season 

|-
| colspan="6" align="center" | St. Louis Renegades (IPFL)
|-
|2001 || 2 || 11 || 0 || 4th League || --
|-
| colspan="6" align="center" | RiverCity Renegades (NIFL)
|-
|2002 || 1 || 13 || 0 || 4th Atlantic Northern || --
|-
| colspan="6" align="center" | Show-Me Believers (NIFL)
|-
|2003 || 4 || 10 || 0 || 5th Pacific Northern || --
|-
|2004 || 9 || 5 || 0 || 2nd Atlantic North || Lost Round 1 (Fort Wayne)
|-
| colspan="6" align="center" | RiverCity Rage (NIFL)
|-
|2005 || 10 || 4 || 0 || 1st Atlantic East || Lost Round 1 (Cincinnati)
|-
|2006 || 13 || 1 || 0 || 1st Atlantic North || Won Round 1 (Wyoming)Won Semifinal (Cincinnati)Lost AC Championship (Fayetteville)
|-
| colspan="6" align="center" | RiverCity Rage (UIF)
|-
|2007 || 9 || 7 || 0 || 2nd East || Lost Round 1 (Lexington)
|-
|2008 || 6 || 8 || 0 || 2nd East || Won Round 1 (Sioux City)Lost Divisional Championship (Bloomington)
|-
| colspan="6" align="center" | RiverCity Rage (IFL)
|-
|2009 || 8 || 6 || 0 || 3rd United Atlantic || Won Round 1 (Rochester)Won Divisional Championship (Maryland) Won United Conference Championship (Wichita)Lost 2009 United Bowl (Billings)
|-
!Totals || 68 || 71 || 0
|colspan="2"| (including playoffs)

2009 roster

RiverCity Rage coaching staff

 Michael pimmel – head coach
 Steve sigmund – Offensive Coordinator 
 Bennie anderson – Assistant Head Coach/Line Coach
 Roger farrar – Offensive Coordinator
 Billy sanders – Defensive Coordinator
 Greg moore – Defensive Quality Control Coach
 Anthony franz – Football Operations Assistant

RiverCity Rage front office

 Jeff sprowls – Owner
 Robert Associate
 Gary baute – Radio/Sales Associate
 Jeff vernetti – Radio/Sales Associate
 Michell jefferson – Director of Cheerleaders
 Ragey the bull – Mascot
 Shawn Balint-Public Address Announcer
 Jeremy clements – On Field Announcer
 Jayson ameer rasheed – GameDay Press Director

References

External links
 Official site
 Rage's 2007 stats
 Rage's 2008 stats

 
2005 establishments in Missouri
2009 disestablishments in Missouri